Lover (Live from Paris) is the fourth live album by American singer-songwriter Taylor Swift, released via Republic Records on February 14, 2023. A Valentine's Day-special release, the album is a limited-edition vinyl record that was sold via Swift's webstore exclusively. It consists of two heart-shaped LPs containing the live recordings of the eight songs from Swift's seventh studio album, Lover (2019), that she performed at City of Lover, her one-day concert at the Olympia, Paris, on September 9, 2019. It charted in Australia, Scotland, the United Kingdom, and the United States, and topped the US Billboard Vinyl Albums chart.

Background
Swift released her seventh studio album, Lover, on August 23, 2019, through Republic Records. She described Lover as a record exploring all forms of love, acting as a "love letter to love". It received positive reviews from music critics, and enjoyed wide commercial success. To celebrate the album's release, Swift held the City of Lover, a one-off concert, at the Olympia music hall in Paris, France, on September 9, 2019. It would become Swift's only official concert to support Lover, as her planned 2020 concert tour, Lover Fest, was canceled after the fallout of the COVID-19 pandemic. On May 17, 2020, the concert was aired as a one-hour special, titled Taylor Swift: City of Lover, on ABC, and was eventually made available for on-demand streaming on Hulu and Disney+. Media outlets opined that the TV special was an alternative to the canceled tour. The TV special only included the eight songs from Lover that were performed at the concert, and excluded the songs she had performed from her other albums. Following the special's premiere, the live versions were released to digital music and streaming platforms, except "The Man", which had been previously available for streaming since February 18, 2020.

Release
On February 13, 2023, Lover (Live from Paris) was announced by Swift's official fan account as a limited-edition vinyl album for release on Valentine's Day via Republic Records. Each package contains two heart-shaped LPs—one pink and the other blue—and was made available for purchase on Swift's webstore exclusively. Lover (Live from Paris) is Swift's fourth live album, following Speak Now World Tour – Live (2011), Live from Clear Channel Stripped 2008 (2020), and Folklore: The Long Pond Studio Sessions (From the Disney+ Special) (2020). Billboard reported that a total of 13,000 copies of the album are available for purchase in the US.

Commercial performance
Lover (Live from Paris) was the best-selling vinyl album in the United States for the chart week dated March 4, 2023. It topped the Billboard Vinyl Albums chart as Swift's ninth number-one album on the chart, landed at number five on the Top Album Sales chart by selling out all of its 13,000 available copies, and debuted at number 58 on the overall Billboard 200. Alongside the live album's entry on the Billboard 200 chart dated March 4, 2023, Swift charted nine other albums, becoming the first artist in history to place at least 10 albums on the Billboard 200 simultaneously since American musician Prince in 2016; Swift is the first living soloist to chart 10 albums in a single week since 1963.

Track listing
All tracks produced by Taylor Swift, and are subtitled as "(Live from Paris)".

Personnel
 Taylor Swift – vocals, producer, writer, piano, guitar
 Max Bernstein – guitar, acoustic guitar, keyboard
 Mike Meadows – acoustic guitar, keyboard
 Paul Sidoti – guitar, acoustic guitar
 Amos Heller – bass, keyboard
 Eliotte Woodford – background vocals
 Jeslyn Gorman – background vocals
 Kamilah Marshall – background vocals
 Melanie Nyema – background vocals
 Matt Billingslea – drums
 David Cook – keyboard
 Jack Antonoff – writer
 Joel Little – writer
 Brendon Urie – writer
 Christopher Rowe – mastering engineer, mixer, recording engineer

Charts

See also
 Unusual types of gramophone records
 Folklore: The Long Pond Studio Sessions (From the Disney+ Special), a 2020 live album by Swift containing performances from the television special of the same name
 Valentine's Day, a 2010 soundtrack album containing two songs by Swift

Notes

References

2023 live albums
Republic Records live albums
Taylor Swift live albums